The Kuwaiti nationality law is the legal pathway for non-nationals to become citizens of the State of Kuwait. The Kuwaiti nationality law is based on a wide range of decrees; first passed in 1920 and then in 1959. An Amiri decree was passed later in 1960. Since the 1960s, the implementation of the nationality law has been very arbitrary and lacks transparency. The lack of transparency prevents non-nationals from receiving a fair opportunity to obtain citizenship. A number of amendments were made in 1980, 1982, 1994, 1998, and 2000.

History of naturalization in Kuwait
The State of Kuwait formally has an official Nationality Law which grants non-nationals a legal pathway to obtain citizenship. However, access to citizenship in Kuwait is autocratically controlled by the Al Sabah ruling family, it is not subject to any external regulatory supervision. The naturalization provisions within the Nationality Law are arbitrarily implemented and lack transparency. The lack of transparency prevents non-nationals from receiving a fair opportunity to obtain citizenship. Consequently, the Al Sabah ruling family have been able to manipulate naturalization for politically-motivated reasons. In the three decades after independence in 1961, the Al Sabah ruling family naturalized hundreds of thousands of foreign Bedouin immigrants predominantly from Saudi Arabia. By the year 1980, as many as 200,000 immigrants were naturalized in Kuwait. Throughout the 1980s, the Al Sabah's politically-motivated naturalization policy continued. The naturalizations were not regulated nor sanctioned by Kuwaiti law. The exact number of naturalizations is unknown but it is estimated that up to 400,000 immigrants were unlawfully naturalized in Kuwait. The foreign Bedouin immigrants were mainly naturalized to alter the demographic makeup of the citizen population in a way that makes the power of the Al Sabah ruling family more secure. As a result of the politically-motivated naturalizations, the number of naturalized citizens exceeds the number of Bedoon in Kuwait. The Al Sabah ruling family actively encouraged foreign Bedouin immigrants to migrate to Kuwait, the Al Sabah ruling family favored naturalizing Bedouin immigrants because they were considered loyal to the ruling family unlike the politically active Palestinian, Lebanese and Syrian expats in Kuwait. The naturalized citizens were predominantly Sunni Saudi immigrants from southern tribes. Accordingly, there are no stateless Bedoon in Kuwait belonging to the Ajman tribe.

Most stateless Bedoon in Kuwait belong to northern tribes (especially Al-Muntafiq). The northern tribes of Kuwait are predominantly Shia Muslims. A minority of stateless Bedoon in Kuwait belong to Kuwait's 'Ajam community. The Kuwaiti judicial system's lack of authority to rule on citizenship further complicates the Bedoon crisis, leaving Bedoon no access to the judiciary to present evidence and plead their case for citizenship. Although non-nationals constitute 70% of Kuwait's total population, the Al Sabah ruling family persistently denies citizenship to most non-nationals including those who fully satisfy the requirements for naturalization as stipulated in the state's official Nationality Law. The Kuwaiti authorities permit the forgeries of hundreds of thousands of politically-motivated naturalizations, while simultaneously denying citizenship to the Bedoon. The politically-motivated naturalizations were noted by the United Nations, political activists, scholars, researchers, and even members of the Al Sabah family. It is widely considered a form of deliberate demographic engineering. It has been likened to Bahrain's politically-motivated naturalization policy. Within the GCC countries, politically-motivated naturalization policies are referred to as "political naturalization" (التجنيس السياسي).

Legal discrimination
Kuwait has more than 300 non-Muslim citizens, mostly Christians and Bahais. In 1982, the parliament amended the constitution to bar non-Muslims from naturalization. There have been multiple proposals made to amend the nationality law to allow non-Muslims to become citizens, but in 2019 the government made clear that its policy was to keep "the current text."

The late Nabeel al-Fadhel submitted an inquiry to the Constitutional Court questioning the constitutionality of barring non-Muslims from obtaining the Kuwaiti nationality. The most recent proposal was made by Saleh Ashour who suggested the repeal of item 5 of article 4 of the nationality law.

Original Kuwaitis 
An original Kuwaiti is a person who settled in Kuwait before 1920. A person who believes that he has maintained his normal residence in Kuwait even though he is living in another country if he has intended to go back to Kuwait is also an original Kuwaiti.

By Birth 
Children born to unknown parents in Kuwait are considered to be Kuwaiti citizens by birth.Children born to foreign parents in Kuwait will not be entitled for Kuwaiti Citizenship

By Descent 
A child born to a Kuwaiti father irrespective of the place of birth is a Kuwaiti citizen.

A child born to a Kuwaiti mother and an unknown father (i.e. out-of-wedlock) irrespective of place is a Kuwaiti citizen. However, Kuwaiti women who have sex out-of-marriage voluntarily and get pregnant in Kuwait can face jail terms along with her partner.

By Marriage

Wife of a Kuwaiti man 
The wife may be granted citizenship only if she declares her wish to be Kuwaiti. She may be granted citizenship only after 18 years for foreigners and 10 years for female citizens of Gulf Cooperation Council countries from the date of her wish to become a Kuwaiti. The Minister of Interior has the right to reduce the number of years. The Kuwaiti husband has to be a Muslim in order to pass his citizenship to his wife.  A wife whose husband was naturalized as a Kuwaiti may be granted citizenship only if she declares her wish to be a Kuwaiti within one year of her husband's naturalization. The children of the naturalization are considered to be Kuwaiti. They can decide whether they want to be Kuwaiti or attain the nationality of the parent's previous citizenship. Termination of marriage will not normally lead to revoking of citizenship. The wife of a husband who takes up the nationality of another country may not lose her nationality unless she wishes to do so. The children of their father who is a naturalized citizen of another nation may not get to keep their Kuwaiti citizenship and have to attain the citizenship of the father. The children may keep their nationality if the law of that country allows it. The children can get back their Kuwaiti citizenship upon attaining the age of majority.

Husband of Kuwaiti woman 
A foreign husband of Kuwaiti woman is not thereby entitled to become a citizen. Their children are not entitled to become citizens unless the father is dead, a POW or has divorced the Kuwaiti mother. Proposals has been made to allow foreign husbands and the children of Kuwaiti women to be naturalized.

Participation in Parliament 
In theory, he/she may not participate in Parliament of Kuwait for the next 30 years if the person is born to unknown parents, a naturalized citizen, a foreign wife of a foreigner who is granted citizenship or a foreign wife of a Kuwaiti who was granted citizenship.

Loss of Kuwaiti citizenship 
He or she may lose their citizenship if they:
 Committed a fraud and declared citizenship without satisfying the necessary criteria. In this case the citizenship of any dependent person may also be revoked.
 are convicted of a crime related to honor or honesty within 15 years of grant of naturalization.
 are dismissed from public office on disciplinary grounds related to honesty or honor within 10 years of grant of naturalization.
 are or were working for a foreign state and plan on seriously to undermine the economic or social structure. The authorities must need proof that he is doing so to revoke her or his citizenship.

Denial of Kuwaiti citizenship 
A person may be denied citizenship if they satisfy the following:
 has begun work in a foreign state in their military
 has worked for a foreign state which has been in war or has suspended diplomatic relations.
 Is a resident in a country abroad and join an association which is plans to seriously undermine the economic or social structure or has been convicted of an offense that involves such a situation.
Any person may be restored or revoked of their citizenship if they have satisfied the above.

Restrictions and points to remember while obtaining citizenship 
 The Head of the Police Department will give a certificate stating that the person is Kuwaiti.
 Proof may be asked while obtaining citizenship
 After the certificate is given an investigation will be carried out. If the investigation finds that the certificate was obtained on the basis of fraud, it will be taken back.
 No Kuwaiti passport will be given for 2 years.
 If a person has given incorrect statements orally or written, the person may be imprisoned for up to 3 years and/or be fined up to 200 KD. If the person has furnished statements which are false, the person may be imprisoned for not more than seven years and/or be fined 500 KD.
 Any passport which has been given to a person in the 2 years as told above will be invalid on the expiration of that two-year period.

Dual nationality 
Kuwait does not recognize dual nationality.

Travel freedom

In 2016, Kuwaiti citizens had visa-free or visa on arrival access to 82 countries and territories, ranking the Kuwaiti passport 57th in the world according to the Visa Restrictions Index.

References 

Nationality law
Nationality law